was a Japanese anarchist, founder of the "pure anarchism" school of thought. He was born in the town Tsu of Mie Prefecture, and lost his parents when he was a child. He was a leading figure of the anarchist movement in Japan. He not only translated the works of prominent anarchist European thinkers, he also advanced their theories. He was a fierce opponent of capitalism and syndicalism. He was also a domestic abuser, reported to have regularly attacked his partner, Hirose Kotaro, with whom he has two children.

References

1886 births
Date of birth missing
People from Tsu, Mie
1934 deaths
Date of death missing
Place of death missing
Japanese anti-capitalists
Japanese anarchists
20th-century Japanese translators